The Call of the Blood (Spanish: "La sangre manda") is a 1934 Mexican drama film written and directed by Jose Bohr. It stars Jose Bohr, Virginia Fabregas, Elisa Robles, and Sara García.

Cast

 José Bohr: José Bolívar
 Virginia Fábregas: Doña Rosa 
 Elisa Robles: Lupe 
 Joaquín Busquets: Chato López
 Julio Villarreal: Julián 'El Pesao'
 Luis G. Barreiro: César, José's valet 
 Godofredo de Velasco: Don Pedro Bolívar
 Beatriz Ramos: Lya Font 
 Delia Magaña: Gladys, Lya's friend 
 Consuelo Segarra: Chabela, a working class mother
 Elisa Asperó: Doña Amparo
 Sara García: Vecina 
 Mario Herrero: Gaspar, steel worker
 Carlos López: Steel worker
 David Valle González: Doctor

External links
 

1934 films
1930s Spanish-language films
Mexican black-and-white films
Mexican drama films
1934 drama films
Films directed by Raphael J. Sevilla
Films directed by José Bohr
1930s Mexican films